Ayazabad (also Romanized as Ayāzābād) is a village in Balyan Rural District, in the Central District of Kazerun County, Fars Province, Iran. At the 2006 census, its population was 254, in 51 families.

References 

Populated places in Kazerun County